Los bellos durmientes (The sleeping beauties) is a theater play by Antonio Gala, premiered in 1994.

Argument 
Diana and Claudio are a successful couple: young, handsome, triumphants and ambitious. They have experienced the success in their professional life, but in their private sphere they find themselves empty, in a lethargy. Until they meet Marcos, who has a completely opposite view of life to theirs. Nieves, Diana's mother, will join to that catharsis they've just begun, and that will lead them to find their own inner reality.

Premiere 
In the Teatro Coliseum of Santander on August 18th 1994.
 Director: Miguel Narros.
 Performers: Amparo Larrañaga (Diana), María Luisa Merlo (Nieves), Eusebio Poncela (Marcos), Carlos Lozano (Claudio).

References 
 Review of the premiere in Madrid in the Diario Abc journal, of September 23rd 1994 (Spanish)

1994 plays